David Quabius (March 16, 1916 – June 19, 1983) was an American basketball player who played in the National Basketball League (NBL).  From Milwaukee, Wisconsin, Quabius played for North Division High School and Marquette University.  Following his college career, Quabius played in the NBL for the Sheboygan Red Skins and Oshkosh All-Stars, averaging 4.7 ponts per game in four seasons.

Quabius died on June 19, 1983, of a heart attack.

References

External links
NBL stats

1916 births
1983 deaths
All-American college men's basketball players
American men's basketball players
Basketball players from Milwaukee
Guards (basketball)
Marquette Golden Eagles men's basketball players
North Division High School (Milwaukee) alumni
Oshkosh All-Stars players
Sheboygan Red Skins players
Deaths from coronary artery disease